Steve Cronshaw (born 1956) is an English male former track cyclist and current coach.

Cycling career
Cronshaw was a four times British track champion after winning the British National Individual Sprint Championships in 1979 and three Tandem titles from 1977 to 1979.

References

1956 births
British male cyclists
British track cyclists
Living people